Michael Allen Anderson (born June 22, 1951) is an American former professional baseball outfielder. He is the brother of former Major League Baseball (MLB) infielder Kent Anderson.

Career

First round draft pick
The Florence, South Carolina native signed a letter of intent to play tight end for the University of South Carolina upon graduation from Timmonsville High School in Timmonsville, South Carolina. He changed paths when he was drafted by the Philadelphia Phillies in the first round (sixth overall) of the 1969 Major League Baseball draft. Over three seasons in the Phillies' farm system, Anderson batted .322 with 21 home runs & 241 runs batted in to earn a September call up to the Phillies at just twenty years old.

Philadelphia Phillies
In his major league debut, he was struck out three times by the New York Mets' Gary Gentry. He rebounded nicely the next day, going three for four with a triple & an RBI. For the season, he batted .247 with two home runs & five RBIs.

During Spring training , Anderson was hit in the head by a pitch from the Cincinnati Reds' Clay Carroll, and carried off the field on a stretcher. He recovered in time to begin the season as the Phillies' everyday right fielder, but after batting just .194 through May, he was demoted to triple A Eugene, with a platoon of Roger Freed & Oscar Gamble taking over in right. He played well for the Eugene Emeralds, batting .298 with seventeen home runs & 56 RBIs, but it wasn't enough to earn him a call backup to the majors that season.

He managed a career high 34 RBIs, but failed to live up to the promise that made him one of the top Phillies' prospects when he first came up to the majors.

St. Louis Cardinals
Anderson was traded from the Phillies to the St. Louis Cardinals for Ron Reed at the Winter Meetings on December 9, 1975. He performed well in this role, batting .333 with four walks in 26 pinch hitting plate appearances. He was released during Spring training .

Baltimore Orioles
After being released by the Cards, Anderson signed a minor league deal with the Phillies. Though he played well for the triple A Oklahoma City 89ers (8 home runs, 34 RBIs, .313 batting average), he did not fit into the Phillies' plans. The team released him in order to allow him to sign elsewhere, and he was immediately picked up by the Baltimore Orioles. His stint in Baltimore did not go well. Used very sparingly by manager Earl Weaver, Anderson batted just .094 in 32 at bats. He was released after the season, and signed with the Phillies once again.

Phillies
After a brief stop in Oklahoma City, Anderson began his third stint with the Phillies on April 28,  with a double in his first at bat. He received most of his playing time as a late inning defensive replacement for Greg Luzinski in left field, though his most memorable performance may have been when he made his debut on the mound on June 27. He struck out both of the first two batters he faced, and pitched a scoreless inning in an 11-4 loss to the Chicago Cubs.

He was released after the season. He spent part of the  season in the Pittsburgh Pirates' minor league system before retiring.

Career statistics

Anderson is a .316 career hitter in the minor leagues.

Sources

External links

Mike Anderson at SABR (Baseball BioProject)
Mike Anderson at Baseball Gauge

1951 births
Living people
Algodoneros de Unión Laguna players
American expatriate baseball players in Mexico
Baltimore Orioles players
Baseball players from South Carolina
Dorados de Chihuahua players
Eugene Emeralds players
Florida Instructional League Phillies players
Leones del Caracas players
Major League Baseball right fielders
Navegantes del Magallanes players
Oklahoma City 89ers players
Peninsula Phillies players
Sportspeople from Florence, South Carolina
Philadelphia Phillies players
Portland Beavers players
St. Louis Cardinals players
American expatriate baseball players in Venezuela